Gods in the Sky was a three-part British television series on Channel 4, covering astronomical religion in early civilizations. It is presented by the historian of science Allan Chapman. The series was filmed in Britain, Egypt, Greece, and Italy.

There is a book of the same name to accompany the series.

References 

2002 British television series debuts
2002 British television series endings
Ancient astronomy
Astronomy in the United Kingdom
Channel 4 documentary series
Documentary television series about astronomy
Historical television series
Religion in ancient history